The Ceahlău Massif is one of the most famous mountains of Romania. It is part of the Bistrița Mountains range of the Eastern Carpathians division, in Neamț County, in the Moldavia region. The two most important peaks are Toaca (1904 m elevation) and Ocolașul Mare (1907 m elevation). It is bounded to the east by the river Bistrița and Lake Bicaz, to the south by the river Bicaz. From the south, the main access point is the village of Izvorul Muntelui, located 12 km north from the town of Bicaz.  To the north, Mount Ceahlău is also accessible from Durău.

Activities

Ceahlău National Park shelters a large variety of flora and fauna; some of the species are endemic or rarely seen elsewhere in Romania.

Hiking

Mount Ceahlău is a popular hiking destination in Romania. There are seven main marked trails built for hikers and tourists. There are entry fees for visiting Ceahlău National Park. and fines for not respecting park's regulations. The park is monitored by local rangers, and there is also a mountain rescue service (Salvamont).

Skiing

There are ski slopes located at Durău.

Camping

Camping is permitted only in a few designated places: in Durău, near Dochia Chalet and in Izvorul Muntelui.

Chalets and refuges

 Izvorul Muntelui Chalet (757 m elevation, basecamp), near Bicaz
 Dochia Chalet (1750 m, near Toaca Peak)
 Fântânele Chalet (1220m, near Durău)
 Ceahlău - Toaca weather station

Notable sights and places

 Duruitoarea waterfall
 Panaghia rock
 Piatra Lată din Ghedeon rock formation
 Ocolașul Mic Peak
 Dochia Rock
 Turnul lui Butu Stone
 Poiana Maicilor (engl: Nuns' glade)
 Poiana Stănile
 Polița cu crini protected area
 Gardul Stănilelor

Other uses of the name

 Ceahlăul Stadium, in Piatra Neamț
 FC Ceahlăul Piatra Neamț, a Romanian soccer team

See also
 Seven Natural Wonders of Romania

References

External links

 Ceahlău National Park official website
 Ceahlău National Park on Romania tourism official website
 Ceahlău on Visit Neamt page
 Picture gallery
 Website with information about the Carpathians Mountains
 Photos of Ceahlău Massif

Mountain ranges of Romania
Geography of Neamț County
Mountain ranges of the Eastern Carpathians
Tourist attractions in Neamț County
Important Bird Areas of Romania